Manson is a surname of Scottish origin. It is an Anglicised version of the Scandinavian name Magnusson, meaning son of Magnus, and a Sept of Clan Gunn. It is particularly common in the far northeast of Scotland in the county of Caithness and in Orkney and Shetland. It is also relatively common in southwest Scotland, in the country of Ayrshire.

Notable people with the surname include:

Amy Manson (born 1985), Scottish actor
Andra Manson (born 1984), American high jumper
Andy Manson, British luthier and custom guitar-maker
 Bruce Manson (born 1956), American tennis player
Charles Manson (1934–2017), adopted surname of cult leader from the United States
Charlotte Manson (born 1924/1925), American actress
Charly Manson (born 1975), Mexican professional wrestler
David Manson (militiaman) (1753–1836), American Revolutionary War aide to General George Washington
David Manson (producer) (born 1952), American film and television producer, screenwriter, and director
David Ames Manson (1841–1929), merchant and political figure in Quebec
Grace Manson (1893–1967), American psychologist
Héléna Manson (1898–1994), French film actress
James Manson (Australian footballer) (born 1966), Australian rules footballer
Jim Manson (Australian footballer) (died 2010), Australia footballer and father of James Manson
Josh Manson (born 1991), American ice hockey player
Mahlon Dickerson Manson (1820–1895), American military officer, Union General during the Civil War
Marilyn Manson (born 1969), stage name of Brian Hugh Warner, American musician and artist
Marilyn Manson (band), the band of the same name
Mark Manson (born 1984), American self-help writer and blogger
Michael Manson (1857–1932), Scottish-born farmer and political figure in British Columbia, Canada
Michael Manson (judge), judge of the Federal Court of Canada
Pat Manson (born 1967), American pole vaulter
Patrick Manson (1844–1922), Scottish physician, pioneer in the field of tropical medicine
Robert Manson (1866 or 1867–1932), Canadian politician
Shirley Manson (born 1966), Scottish musician and actress
Stephen Manson (born 1986), Scottish footballer
Thomas Walter Manson (1893–1958), English biblical scholar
William Manson (1867–1953), Scottish-born accountant, notary public, and MLA for Alberni and Skeena in British Columbia, Canada
William Manson (theologian) (1882–1958), British theologian 
William J. Manson (1872–1948), Scottish-born magistrate and MLA for Dewdney in British Columbia, Canada

Fictional characters
 Samantha Manson, one of the main characters of Danny Phantom

See also
Mansun

References

Surnames of Scottish origin